William Pye Baddeley (20 March 1914 – 31 May 1998) was an Anglican priest who was the Dean of Brisbane from 1958 to 1967.

Early life
He was born in Shropshire on 20 March 1914, the son of the French singer Louise Bourdin. His mother had married a composer, William Clinton-Baddeley, in 1896, with whom she had a number of children, including the actresses Angela and Hermione Baddeley. By 1914 Clinton-Baddeley had left, and Bourdin had taken in lodgers. It was to one of these, known only as 'Uncle Pye', that William Bye Baddeley was born. The young William was given away to a family in Fulham, where his birth was registered. Unlike his half-sisters, who were educated privately, Baddeley was educated at a local school. He drifted into the orbit of the Rev Cyril Easthaugh at St John the Divine, Kennington.  Eastaugh arranged for Baddeley to attend a crammer at Tatterford, Norfolk, run by the Rev William Hand (whose son David would become the first Archbishop of the Anglican Church of Papua New Guinea).

Clerical career
From Tatterford he went on to St Chad's College, Durham and trained for ordination at Cuddesdon, Oxford. He was ordained deacon in 1941 and priest in 1942, and served curacies at St Luke's, Camberwell (1941-1944), St Anne's Church, Wandsworth (1944-1946) and St Stephen's Church, Bournemouth (1946-1949).

He was then appointed Vicar of St Pancras (1949–58), for whose restoration he is credited with having raised £60,000 (worth £1.5m as of 2019 adjusting for inflation). During that time he was also Chaplain to the Elizabeth Garrett Anderson Hospital (1949-1958) and St Luke's Hospital for the Clergy (1952-1954). In 1958 he was appointed Dean of Brisbane. Upon his return to England he was Rector of St James's, Piccadilly from 1967 to 1980, during which period restoration of Sir Christopher Wren's spire was completed after bombing in the war. He was Chaplain to the Royal Academy of Arts (1968–80), Chairman of the Malcolm Sargent Cancer Fund for Children (1968–92) and a Life Governor of the Thomas Coram Foundation for Children from 1955.

He was also active in Australian civic life when he was in Brisbane, being active in the arts as President of the Brisbane Repertory Theatre (1961–64) and Director of the Australian Elizabethan Theatre Trust (1963–67), and making television and other media appearances to which "the Australian public responded, as had his English audiences, to his joie de vivre"; as Sir James Killen recalled, "There was nothing sedating about his sermons."

Personal life
He died on 31 May 1998. He was survived by his wife, Shirley (née Wyatt), who was daughter of Lt-Col Ernest Wyatt CBE DSO, a niece of Field Marshal Sir Claud Jacob, first cousin of Lt-Gen Sir Ian Jacob, and a direct descendant of both Robert Caldwell and twice-appointed Apothecary to the Household John Nussey, who was master of the Worshipful Society of Apothecaries of London. They had one daughter.

References

1914 births
1998 deaths
Clergy from London
Alumni of St Chad's College, Durham
Alumni of Durham University
Alumni of Ripon College Cuddesdon
Deans of Brisbane